Justice Marbury may refer to:

Charles Clagett Marbury, judge of the Maryland Court of Appeals
Ogle Marbury, chief judge of the Maryland Court of Appeals